Synanthedon serica is a moth of the family Sesiidae. It is found in Russia, Kazakhstan, Central Asia and north-western China.

The wingspan is about 20 mm.

References

Moths described in 1882
Sesiidae